Re! is the name of a Greek album by singer Anna Vissi released in Greece and Cyprus on December 24, 1994. It was recorded in London at Whitfield Street Recording Studios and released by Sony Music Greece. It is the most acoustic album Vissi has released up to date. It was repackaged in 1995 to include the songs "Amin", "Eleni" and a remix of "Eimai Poli Kala". Music and lyrics are by Nikos Karvelas and Evi Droutsa.

Release
Re! was originally released on December 24, 1994, featuring ten songs. In early to mid 1995, the album was re-released to include the songs "Amin"  and "Eleni" and a remix of "Eimai Poli Kala", reaching sales to Gold status, with more than 40,000 units sold. The lyrics of the bonus tracks, though, were not included in the album's liner notes and overall no significant change was made in the original artwork. In 1999, a Turkish artist Hülya Avşar covered the single "Eleni" with the Turkish lyrics as "Sevdim" (I loved), which met moderate success, while radio stations also picked up the original version by Anna Vissi. Sony Music Turkey then decided upon the release of Re! in Turkey. The album reached 2× Platinum in Turkey.

The singles "Eimai Poli Kala", "Re!", "Amin" and "Eleni" were released on accompanying promotional videos during 1994 and 1995, all of which aired in local TV stations. "Eimai Poli Kala", directed by Nikos Soulis, was especially acclaimed at the time for the use of CGI graphics, applied on real-life locations around the city of Athens, a relatively unknown technology for the Greek market. 

In 2001, "Eimai Poli Kala" and "Eleni" were selected for digital release on Vissi's The Video Collection.

In 2019, the album was selected for inclusion in the Panik Gold box set The Legendary Recordings 1982-2019. The release came after Panik's acquisition rights of Vissi's back catalogue from her previous record company Sony Music Greece. This box set was printed on a limited edition of 500 copies containing CD releases of all of her albums from 1982 to 2019 plus unreleased material.

Track listing 
Original 1994 LP, MC and CD release
 "Re!" (Hey you!)
 "30 Kai Vale" (Thirty something)
 "Eimai Poli Kala" (I'm very well)
 "Paragrafos 62" (Paragraph 62)
 "To Allo Mou Ego" (My other self)
 "I Varka" (The boat)
 "Melanholies" (Melancholies)
 "Diadilosi" (The protest)
 "Efta Zoes" (Seven lives)
 "Palio Periodiko" (Old magazine) 
"Amin" (Amen)
"Eleni" (Helen)
"Ime Poli Kala (Dance Mix)" (I'm very well (Dance Mix))

1995 Re-release (Only on LP, MC and CD)
 "Re!" (Hey you!)
 "30 Kai Vale" (Thirty something)
 "Eimai Poli Kala" (I'm very well)
 "Paragrafos 62" (Paragraph 62)
 "To Allo Mou Ego" (My other self)
 "I Varka" (The boat)
 "Melanholies" (Melancholies)
 "Diadilosi" (The protest)
 "Efta Zoes" (Seven lives)
 "Periodiko" (Magazine)
 "Amin" (Amen)
 "Eleni" (Helen)
 "Ime Poli Kala (Dance Mix)" (I'm very well (Dance Mix))

Turkish Release
 "Eleni"
 "Amin"
 "Re!"
 "30 Kai Vale"
 "Eimai Poli Kala"
 "Paragrafos 62"
 "To Allo Mou Ego"
 "I Varka"
 "Melanholies"
 "Diadilosi"
 "Efta Zoes"
 "Periodiko"

Singles
The following songs were released as singles from the album and were accompanied by music videos.
 "Re!"
 "Eimai Poli Kala"
 "Amin
 "Eleni"

Credits and personnel

Personnel
Agapitos - bouzouki on track “Eleni”
Nikos Chatzopoulos - violin 
Evi Droutsa - lyrics
Nikos Karvelas - music, lyrics, keyboards, guitar on the track “I Varka”
Alexis Mpoulgourtzis - percussions (darbhuka, bendir, tambhit, bongus, conga, triangle, cymbals)
Sakis Pilatos - bass on track “Eleni”
Panagiotis Stergiou - acoustic guitars, üti, bouzouki, tzouras, baglamas, acoustic bass
John Themis - guitars on track “Paragrafos 62”
Anna Vissi - vocals

Production
Nikos Karvelas/Sony Music - production management, arrangements, instrumentation
Martyn ‘Max’ Heyes - recording engineering at Whitfield Street Recording Studios (London) 
U.B.A. - preproduction at Studio Hampstead
 Jason Westbrook - assistant recording engineer
 
Design
Brian Aris - photos
Michael Charalambous - hair styling from Neville & Daniel Knightsbridge 
Yiannis Doxas - cover design
Sheryll Phelps Gardener - make up artist

Credits adapted from the album's liner notes.

References

Anna Vissi albums
1994 albums
Greek-language albums
Sony Music Greece albums
Albums produced by Nikos Karvelas